Indwarra is a national park in New South Wales, Australia, 422 km north of Sydney. It is located on the central New England Tablelands and covers an area of over 900ha.

The park was created in January 1999. Flora surveys were conducted in 2002, revealing 220 species of flora in the park. The highest and most prominent mountain in the national park is Mount Tingha, which rises to 1208 meters above sea level.

See also
 Protected areas of New South Wales
 High Conservation Value Old Growth forest..

References

National parks of New South Wales
Protected areas established in 1999
1999 establishments in Australia